Solidago curtisii, commonly called Curtis' goldenrod and mountain decumbent goldenrod, is a North American species of flowering plants in the family Asteraceae. It is the eastern part of the United States from Pennsylvania to Mississippi and Alabama, primarily in the southern Appalachian Mountains.

Solidago curtisii is a perennial herb sometimes as much as 100 cm (40 inches) tall, with a thick, woody underground caudex. Stem is narrow, wiry, and dark purple. One plant can produce up to 800 small yellow flower heads in small clumps in the axils of the leaves.

Varieties
Solidago curtisii var. curtisii - high elevations in mountains from Georgia to West Virginia
Solidago curtisii var. flaccidifolia (Small) R.E.Cook & Semple - lower elevations from Mississippi to Pennsylvania

References

External links
Alabama Plants photo
Digital Atlas of the Virginia Flora

curtisii
Flora of the Eastern United States
Plants described in 1842